Muhammad Nidzam Adzha Yusoff (born 11 March 1968) is a Malaysian football coach and former footballer. He is the current assistant head coach of Malaysia Super League side Kuala Lumpur FC

Career as player
He formerly played with Kedah FA, as well with Perak FA in Malaysian League (M-League).

He also playing for the national team and made his debut in 1991 Merdeka Tournament and was dropped after the World Cup qualifier in 1991. It took him three years to return into the national team but again he dropped because of injury.

He once made controversy when he leave Perak to join Kedah in 1993 season. In his first season with Kedah, he help the team to win two trophy. In 1995, he arrested on suspicion of match-fixing but the charges against him were dropped.

Career as coach
Nidzam was formerly with Perlis FA as a coach in 2010. He also was an assistant coach with Kuala Muda Naza FC, later becoming head coach with them in 2009. Earlier, he was also an assistant coach with now defunct club, Kelantan TNB.

In 2012 he coaches Kedah FA President's Cup U-23 squad, and also the caretaker head coach for Kedah senior squad for the first 7 games of 2012 Super League Malaysia as head coach Wan Jamak Wan Hassan is suspended by Football Association of Malaysia for the same duration for criticising refereeing decisions in a 2011 Malaysia Cup match involving Kedah. On 23 May 2017 Mohd Nidzam was officially appointed as the head coach for Kedah by the Kedah Football Association (KFA) as a replacement for former coach Tan Cheng Hoe who has since joined the Malaysia national football team as assistant coach. He were released from his position to make way for new head coach Ramon Marcote before the start of the 2018 season, however he were reappointed by Kedah as head coach on March the same year, replacing Marcote.

Managerial statistics

Honours

Coach

Club
Kedah FA
 Malaysia FA Cup :  2017
 Malaysia Cup runner-up: 2017

References

Malaysian footballers
Malaysia international footballers
Perak F.C. players
Perlis FA managers
1968 births
Living people
People from Perak
Malaysian people of Malay descent
Association football forwards
Kuala Lumpur City F.C. managers